Semiricinula squamosa is a species of sea snail, a marine gastropod mollusk in the family Muricidae, the murex snails or rock snails.

Description
The solid shell varies in length between 20 mm and 45 mm. Its sculpture shows varices with low spines. The color is creamy white with dark brown bands, brown or mottled. The oval aperture is narrowed by protruding plaits. It has a pale color with white inner lip.

Distribution
This species is distributed in shallow rocky areas in the Indian Ocean along Aldabra and Tanzania and in the Indo-West Pacific.

References

 Richmond, M. (Ed.) (1997). A guide to the seashores of Eastern Africa and the Western Indian Ocean islands. Sida/Department for Research Cooperation, SAREC: Stockholm, Sweden. . 448 pp

Semiricinula
Gastropods described in 1868